Brayden Lyle (born 6 March 1973) is a former Australian rules footballer who played for the West Coast Eagles and vice-captained Port Adelaide in the Australian Football League (AFL).

AFL career

West Coast Eagles career (1995–1996)
Lyle played for the West Coast Eagles in the 1995 and 1996 seasons, taking part in the club's finals campaign in the former year but then continued to struggle to break into the West Coast midfield, which was one of the AFL's strongest at the time. When not playing for West Coast, Lyle appeared for Western Australian Football League (WAFL) club East Perth.

Port Adelaide career (1997–2001)
Lyle returned to Port Adelaide in 1997 for their inaugural AFL season. He was named vice-captain alongside teammate Matthew Primus and captained Port in their first game (due to Gavin Wanganeen being suspended). Lyle averaged a career high 22 disposals the 1997, a remarkable turnaround after only playing 25 games in three years at West Coast. He was mostly used in the midfield as a centreman. Lyle won Port's Best Team Man award in his first two seasons (1997 and 1998). In 1997 he also represented South Australia in a State of Origin game against Victoria at Football Park and won the Fos Williams Medal.

With development of Port's depth in midfield he struggled in 2001 as younger, quicker players overtook Lyle and he was delisted at the end of the year.

References

Holmesby, Russell and Main, Jim (2007). The Encyclopedia of AFL Footballers. 7th ed. Melbourne: Bas Publishing.

1973 births
Living people
Australian rules footballers from South Australia
West Coast Eagles players
Port Adelaide Football Club players
Port Adelaide Football Club players (all competitions)
Port Adelaide Magpies players
South Australian State of Origin players
Port Adelaide Football Club (SANFL) players
East Perth Football Club players